Robert Torres (29 August 1938 – 4 February 2021) was a Brazilian politician who served as a Deputy from 1987 to 1995. Torres died from COVID-19 in Maceió on 4 February 2021.

References

1938 births
2021 deaths
Members of the Chamber of Deputies (Brazil) from Alagoas
Deaths from the COVID-19 pandemic in Alagoas